The Chief of the Naval Staff (CMS, or Marinstabschef) is the professional head of the Swedish Naval Staff. The post was created in 1907 with rear admiral Theodor Sandström as the first incumbent. The post disappeared in 1994 and was reintroduced in 2019 when the new Naval Staff was established.

History
The Chief of the Naval Staff post was created in 1907 after the Chief of the Fleet Staff was eliminated. The Chief of the Naval Staff was from 1936 to 1994 the second most senior member of the Swedish Navy after the Chief of the Navy and headed the Naval Staff. The position was initially held alternately by a rear admiral or a captain until 1964. In 1964, a change was made from which branch the Chief of the Naval Staff was selected. As a rule, the Chief of the Naval Staff was an officer of the Swedish Coastal Artillery, if the Chief of the Navy was an officer of the Swedish Fleet (Flottan), and a naval officer if the coastal artillery officer was Chief of the Navy. The Chief of the Navy was always a naval officer and thus the Chief of the Naval Staff remained a coastal artillery officer until the Naval Staff was disbanded in 1994 and the office was eliminated. In 2019, the Naval Staff was re-established and a Chief of the Naval Staff was appointed again, this time held by a captain.

Chiefs of the Naval Staff

Chiefs of the Naval Staff (1907–1994)

|-style="text-align:center;"
!colspan=9|None (1994–2019)

Vice Chiefs of the Naval Staff

Footnotes

References

Print

Military appointments of Sweden
1907 establishments in Sweden
1994 disestablishments in Sweden
2019 establishments in Sweden
Navy chiefs of staff